Jon'Vea J'Qyay Johnson (born December 23, 1995) is an American football wide receiver for the Memphis Showboats of the United States Football League (USFL). He played college football at the University of Toledo.

Early years
Johnson attended West Side Leadership Academy, and was coached by his father in football. As a junior, he registered 47 receptions for 1,054 yards and 9 touchdowns, receiving All-area honors.

As a senior, he posted 73 receptions for 1,428 yards and 23 touchdowns, receiving All-state honors and was named one of the top 22 players in the state by Indiana Preps.

He also practiced basketball and was a two-time All-state sprinter, finishing third in the 100 metres at the 2013 state finals.

College career
Johnson accepted a football scholarship from the University of Toledo. As a redshirt freshman, he appeared in 12 games (one start), making 10 receptions for 142 yards and one receiving touchdown.

As a sophomore, he started 11 out of 13 games, recording 40 receptions for 773 yards (third on the team), a 19.3-yard average and 10 receiving touchdowns (tied for fifth in school history). He had 9 receptions, 182 yards (seventh in school history) and 3 receiving touchdowns (tied for third in school history) against Brigham Young University.

As a junior, he started all 14 games, collecting 42 receptions for 689 yards (second on the team), a 16.4-yard average and 5 receiving touchdowns. He had 5 receptions for 102 yards and 2 touchdowns against the University of Akron in the MAC Championship Game.

As a senior, he was a backup behind first-team All-conference wide receivers Diontae Johnson and Cody Thompson. He appeared in all 12 games (2 starts), registering 32 receptions for 660 yards (second on the team), a 20.6-yard average and 9 receiving touchdowns. He had 6 receptions for 112 yards and 2 touchdowns against Fresno State University.

He finished his college career with 53 games (second in school history), 125 receptions, 2,265 yards, a 18.1-yard average and 25 receiving touchdowns.

Professional career

Dallas Cowboys
Johnson was signed by the Dallas Cowboys as an undrafted free agent after the 2019 NFL Draft on April 30. He was one of the team's early standouts during organized team activities, but struggled during preseason games. He was placed on the injured reserve list with a shoulder injury on August 30.

Johnson was placed on the reserve/COVID-19 list by the Cowboys on July 26, 2020. He was activated on August 9, 2020. He was waived on September 5, 2020 and signed to the practice squad the next day. He signed a reserve/future contract with the Cowboys on January 4, 2021. He was waived by the Cowboys on March 19, 2021.

Jacksonville Jaguars
On March 20, 2021, Johnson was claimed off waivers by the Jacksonville Jaguars. He was waived on June 19.

Chicago Bears
Johnson was signed by the Chicago Bears on July 27, 2021. He was waived on August 31, 2021 and re-signed to the practice squad the next day. He was released on November 4.

Montreal Alouettes
On August 8, 2022, Johnson was signed by the Montreal Alouettes. He spent the entire 2022 season on the practice roster and was released upon the completion of the Alouettes' season on November 14, 2022.

Memphis Showboats
On February 14, 2023, Johnson signed with the Memphis Showboats of the United States Football League (USFL).

Personal life
His father Jason Johnson played in the NFL as a wide receiver for the Denver Broncos, Pittsburgh Steelers and New Orleans Saints.

References

External links
Toledo Rockets bio

1995 births
Living people
Players of American football from Gary, Indiana
American football wide receivers
Toledo Rockets football players
Dallas Cowboys players
Jacksonville Jaguars players
Chicago Bears players
Montreal Alouettes players
Memphis Showboats (2022) players